Other Covers is the second covers album by singer-songwriter James Taylor, released in April 2009 in the form of an EP and as a follow-up to the previous year's Covers.

History
The songs on this mini-digipak CD were recorded during the same January 2008 Massachusetts barn sessions as Covers, and some of them had already been released as bonus tracks for that album.

Track listing
 "Oh, What a Beautiful Mornin'" (Richard Rodgers, Oscar Hammerstein II) – 3:10
 "Get a Job" (The Silhouettes) – 4:07
 "Memphis" (Chuck Berry) – 3:10
 "Shiver Me Timbers" (Tom Waits) – 4:19
 "Wasn't That a Mighty Storm?" (Traditional; arranged by Eric Von Schmidt) – 4:15
 "In the Midnight Hour" (Wilson Pickett, Steve Cropper) – 3:14
 "Knock on Wood" (Eddie Floyd, Steve Cropper) – 3:52

Personnel
 James Taylor – lead vocals, guitar, harmonica
 Luis Conte – percussion
 Walt Fowler – trumpet, flugelhorn, additional keyboards
 Steve Gadd – drums
 Larry Goldings – piano, keyboards
 Jimmy Johnson – bass
 Michael Landau – lead guitar
 David Lasley – backing vocals
 Lou Marini Jr. – flute, clarinet, saxophones
 Kate Markowitz – backing vocals
 Arnold McCuller – backing vocals
 Andrea Zonn – violin, backing vocals

Chart positions

References

2009 debut EPs
James Taylor albums
Covers EPs
Hear Music albums